Sir David Read FRS is Emeritus Professor of Plant Science in the Department of Animal and Plant Sciences at University of Sheffield. His first degree and PhD came from University of Hull, the latter in 1963. He also serves on the Rothamsted Research Board of Directors

Read's research focuses on plant and fungal physiology and ecology, particularly the biology of root-fungus symbioses.

Honours and awards
Read was elected a Fellow of the Royal Society in 1990 and was formerly its Vice President and Biological Secretary until 2008 when he was succeeded by Professor Dame Jean Thomas. 
He was the 2002 recipient of the Kempe Award for Distinguished Ecologists. He was knighted in 2007. The same year, he was made honorary doctor at Lund University.

References

Year of birth missing (living people)
Living people
British botanists
Fellows of the Royal Society
Knights Bachelor
People educated at Sexey's School